The Peel Session is a collection of recordings by Syd Barrett released on 25 January 1987. This EP contains the five songs he performed for the John Peel Top Gear show, recorded on 24 February 1970 and broadcast shortly after.

Track listing
All songs written by Syd Barrett.

 "Terrapin" – 3:02
 "Gigolo Aunt" – 3:35
 "Baby Lemonade" – 2:37
 "Effervescing Elephant" – 0:57
 "Two of a Kind" – 2:28

Personnel
Syd Barrett – acoustic guitar, vocals
David Gilmour – bass guitar, electric guitar, organ
Jerry Shirley – percussion

See also
The Radio One Sessions

References
Footnotes

Citations

Barrett, Syd
Syd Barrett live albums
Albums produced by John Walters (broadcaster)
1987 live albums
Live EPs
1987 EPs